Oleg Albertovich Skorlukov (born March 2, 1968) is a Russian politician who served in the State Duma of Russia. He has attended higher education. He is a member of the LDPR.  His was Deputy Chairman of the Committee on Economic Policy, Entrepreneurship and Tourism.

References

1968 births
Living people
Fourth convocation members of the State Duma (Russian Federation)
Liberal Democratic Party of Russia politicians